Hasanabad (also Romanized as Ḩasanābād; also known as Galan Gadar and Galangadar) is a village in Qaflankuh-e Gharbi Rural District, in the Central District of Meyaneh County, East Azerbaijan Province, Iran. At the 2006 census, its population was 1,338, in 293 families.

References 

Populated places in Meyaneh County